The Nebula Award for Best Novelette is given each year by the Science Fiction and Fantasy Writers of America (SFWA) to a science fiction or fantasy novelette. A work of fiction is defined by the organization as a novelette if it is between 7,500 and 17,500 words; awards are also given out for pieces of longer lengths in the Novel and Novella categories, and for shorter lengths in the Short Story category. To be eligible for Nebula Award consideration a novelette must be published in English in the United States. Works published in English elsewhere in the world are also eligible provided they are released on either a website or in an electronic edition. The Nebula Award for Best Novelette has been awarded annually since 1966. The Nebula Awards have been described as one of "the most important of the American science fiction awards" and "the science-fiction and fantasy equivalent" of the Emmy Awards.

Nebula Award nominees and winners are chosen by members of SFWA, though the authors of the nominees do not need to be members. Works are nominated each year by members in a period around December 15 through January 31, and the six works that receive the most nominations then form the final ballot, with additional nominees possible in the case of ties. Soon after, members are given a month to vote on the ballot, and the final results are presented at the Nebula Awards ceremony in May. Authors are not permitted to nominate their own works, and ties in the final vote are broken, if possible, by the number of nominations the works received. The rules were changed to their current format in 2009. Previously, the eligibility period for nominations was defined as one year after the publication date of the work, which allowed the possibility for works to be nominated in the calendar year after their publication and then be awarded in the calendar year after that. Works were added to a preliminary list for the year if they had ten or more nominations, which were then voted on to create a final ballot, to which the SFWA organizing panel was also allowed to add an additional work.

During the 58 nomination years, 231 authors have had works nominated; 49 of these have won, including co-authors and ties. Ted Chiang has won three times out of three nominations, and Poul Anderson, Kelly Link, George R. R. Martin, Sarah Pinsker, and Connie Willis have each won twice out of five, two, four, six, and five nominations, respectively. One of Anderson's nominations was under the pseudonym Michael Karageorge. Ursula K. Le Guin has the most nominations of any author with seven, including one win and not including one withdrawn nomination. James Patrick Kelly and Richard Bowes are tied for the most nominations without winning at six.

Winners and nominees

In the following table, the years correspond to the date of the ceremony, rather than when the novelette was first published. Each year links to the corresponding "year in literature". Entries with a blue background and an asterisk (*) next to the writer's name have won the award; those with a white background are the other nominees on the shortlist.

  *   Winners and joint winners

See also
 Hugo Award for Best Novelette

Explanatory notes

References

External links
 Nebula Awards official site

1966 establishments in the United States
Awards established in 1966
Novelette
Short story awards